Kahnuyeh (also Romanized as Kahnūyeh and Kahnowyeh; also known as Kahnoo and Kahnow) is a village in Alamarvdasht Rural District, Alamarvdasht District, Lamerd County, Fars Province, Iran. At the 2006 census, its population was 1,252, in 239 families.

References 

Populated places in Lamerd County